Louis Dennis DeBrusk (born March 19, 1971) is a Canadian former professional ice hockey player. He is currently a colour analyst for Edmonton Oilers broadcasts on Sportsnet and the late game of Hockey Night in Canada.

Playing career
DeBrusk was raised in Port Elgin, Ontario and played junior hockey with the Port Elgin Bears and Stratford Cullitons before joining the London Knights. 

Drafted by the New York Rangers in the third round of the 1989 NHL Entry Draft, DeBrusk would never appear in a game for the club as he was traded to the Edmonton Oilers on October 4, 1991 in a package with Bernie Nicholls, and Steven Rice for Mark Messier. Debrusk joined the Tampa Bay Lightning as a free agent on August 27, 1997 to replace 'tough' players Rudy Poeschek and Brantt Myhres when he signed a two-year, two-way deal worth about $750,000, with the second year at the Lightning's option, before being traded to the Phoenix Coyotes on June 11th, 1998, along with a 5th round pick in the 1998 for Craig Janney. Debrusk, an impending restricted free agent, was resigned by the Coyotes on August 10, 1998. On August 30, 2002, by this time again an unrestricted free agent, Debrusk signed a contract with the Chicago Blackhawks. He would last appear in a professional hockey game during the 2003–04 AHL season. Altogether, Debrusk played 401 National Hockey League games.

DeBrusk was known for his fighting skills and racked up 1161 penalty minutes over the course of his NHL career.

He was inducted to his hometown Cambridge's Sports Hall of Fame in 2018.

Broadcasting career
Debrusk is the main colour analyst on the late game of Hockey Night in Canada. He previously worked as the colour commentator for the Phoenix Coyotes radio broadcasts. On September 2, 2008, DeBrusk was announced as the new colour commentator for NHL on Sportsnet Edmonton Oilers television broadcasts, replacing former analyst Ray Ferraro. He was replaced by Drew Remenda in 2014 but continued as an analyst, before rejoining the Oilers broadcast team as a colour commentator for the 2020-21 season, alongside announcer Jack Michaels.

Personal life
DeBrusk's son Jake DeBrusk also plays in the NHL. He was ranked the 24th-best player available in the 2015 NHL Entry Draft by NHL Central Scouting,  and subsequently selected 14th overall that year by the Boston Bruins.

Career statistics

References

External links
 Profile at the Coyotes' website
 

1971 births
Living people
Arizona Coyotes announcers
Binghamton Rangers players
Cape Breton Oilers players
Chicago Blackhawks players
Edmonton Oilers announcers
Edmonton Oilers players
Hamilton Bulldogs (AHL) players
Hartford Wolf Pack players
Ice hockey people from Ontario
Las Vegas Thunder players
London Knights players
Long Beach Ice Dogs (IHL) players
National Hockey League broadcasters
New York Rangers draft picks
Norfolk Admirals players
People from Cambridge, Ontario
Phoenix Coyotes players
Quebec Citadelles players
San Antonio Dragons players
Springfield Falcons players
Tampa Bay Lightning players
Canadian ice hockey left wingers